Breastwork may mean:
Breastwork (fortification), a temporary military fortification
Breastwork monitor, a type of heavily armored Royal Navy warship
Breast implant, surgical alteration of the breast